The Lucerne School of Music (Hochschule Luzern – Musik)  is a professional school for musicians located in Lucerne, Switzerland, and closely associated with the city's annual music festival. It is a division of the  Lucerne University of Applied Sciences and Arts.

History
The school was formed in 1999 when the city's Conservatory of Music, Academy of Church Music, and Jazz School merged into a single university-status institution, called Musikhochschule Luzern (Lucerne College of Music).

The school began offering master's degrees in music in fall 2008. At about the same time, it became a division, or Departement, of the Lucerne University of Applied Sciences and Arts.

Alumni include organist and conductor Andreas Reize, the 18th Thomaskantor after Bach, and jazz pianist Luzia von Wyl.

External links
 Hochschule Luzern - Musik 
 Welcome page in English

Music schools in Switzerland
Education in Lucerne